Hemraj Pande (17th century CE) was an Indian author who had written commentaries on numerous Jain texts. He was a disciple of Rupchand Pande who had delivered sermons on Gommatasara in 1635. He wrote a commentary on Pravachanasara of Kundakunda in 1652 based on the commentary on Samayasara by Rajmall. He also wrote the differences between Jain sects, Digambara and Svetambara, in Chaurasi Bol in the same year. He wrote these texts on the request of Kanvarpal or Kaurnpal of Agra. He wrote some original works in Brajbhasha. He also translated Bhaktamara Stotra, a sixth century Jain composition, of Manatunga. This was done in the style of translation of Kalyanamandir stotra's by Banarsidas.

References

Citations

Sources
 

17th-century Indian writers